[
  {
    "type": "ExternalData",
    "service": "page",
    "title": "New England Road Marking System/New Hampshire Interstate Routes.map"
  },
{
    "type": "ExternalData",
    "service": "page",
    "title": "New England Road Marking System/Connecticut Interstate Routes.map"
  },
{
    "type": "ExternalData",
    "service": "page",
    "title": "New England Road Marking System/Massachusetts Interstate Routes.map"
  },
{
    "type": "ExternalData",
    "service": "page",
    "title": "New England Road Marking System/Rhode Island Interstate Routes.map"
  },
{
    "type": "ExternalData",
    "service": "page",
    "title": "New England Road Marking System/Vermont Interstate Routes.map"
  },
{
    "type": "ExternalData",
    "service": "page",
    "title": "New England Road Marking System/Maine Interstate Routes.map"
  }
]
The New England road marking system was a regional system of marked numbered routes in the six-state region of New England in the United States. The routes were marked by a yellow rectangular sign with black numbers and border. Many signs were painted on telephone poles. The routes were approved by the highway departments of the six New England states in April 1922.

Prior to the New England road marking system, through routes were mainly marked with colored bands on telephone poles. These were assigned by direction (red for east–west, blue for north–south and yellow for intermediate or diagonal routes). The Massachusetts Highway Commission convinced the rest of southern New England and New York to use this system in 1915 (New Hampshire and Vermont already had their own schemes, and Maine also opted out), and it was the main system until 1922.

The New England road marking system, while limited to New England, was designed for expansion to the whole country. One- and two-digit numbers were assigned to major interstate routes, with three-digit routes for state routes (marked in a rectangle, with the state abbreviation below the number). In general, odd numbers ran east–west and even numbers ran north–south. The main exception was Route 1, which was to run along the Atlantic coast from Florida to Calais, Maine. A few of the major auto trails were not to be assigned numbers, instead being marked with letters—for instance, L for the Lincoln Highway and R for the Roosevelt International Highway.

In 1926, several of the routes were supplanted by the national United States Numbered Highway System. Except for Route 1, which became U.S. Route 1, the old numbers were not used, since the U.S. Highway System uses odd numbers for north–south routes and even numbers for east–west routes. While some of the routes that did not become U.S. Routes were disbanded in the 1930s, many of these routes were transferred to state highway systems, often retaining their original route numbers.

Background 
Before 1915, there was no uniform method to mark major throughways in New England or New York. Vermont and New Hampshire had existing pole marking schemes, though these varied between the states. Vermont's system was unique because route colors were not determined by direction, but by funding and responsibility for maintenance. Maine also had an existing lettering scheme, established in 1914. Many states at this time had numbering systems solely for government use. For example, Connecticut had established an internal system of trunk lines in 1900, which had grown to 14 routes by 1913, but this system was not signposted. In 1908, the New York legislature had laid out 37 routes slated for maintenance solely by the state, but there was no proper numbering until 1924.

In 1915, the Massachusetts Highway Commission proposed to the New England States and New York to adopt a uniform pole-marking scheme, with red bands signifying major east-west routes, blue bands signifying major north-south routes, and all secondary routes marked yellow. All the states agreed to the system, though New Hampshire and Vermont stipulated that these routes would not replace their existing systems.

This system held in most of these states, though Maine supplanted this system in 1919 with its own system of auto trails. By 1922, it was generally agreed that pole markings in general were too inconsistent from region to region. In April 1922, delegates from the New England states met at a dinner conference hosted by the Automobile Club of America to coordinate a new system. Soon thereafter, the system was approved by the highway commissions of all the states involved, and signing began soon thereafter. Maine did not use the system until 1925.

Routes by number

Interstate routes

Route 1

Route 1, or the Atlantic Highway, began in Greenwich, Connecticut, from which the main highway of the Atlantic Coast continued to New York City. The highway followed the coast of Long Island Sound through Stamford, Norwalk, and Bridgeport to Stratford, where the highway met the southern end of Route 8. Route 1 continued through Milford and had a junction with Route 2 in New Haven. The highway continued east to Old Saybrook, where it met the southern terminus of Route 10 and crossed the Connecticut River. Route 1 met the southern ends of Route 12 and Route 32 in New London and Groton, respectively. The highway intersected the eastern end of Route 17 in Stonington, Connecticut, immediately before entering Westerly, Rhode Island.

Route 1 immediately intersected the southern end of Route 1A on entering Rhode Island. Route 1A followed a shorter, more inland route between Westerly and Providence. Route 1 paralleled the Block Island Sound coast to Narragansett, where the highway turned north along Narragansett Bay toward Warwick and Providence. In the state capital, Route 1 collected the other end of Route 1A and intersected Route 3. The highway passed through Pawtucket and entered Massachusetts. Route 1 went straight toward Boston, where the route met the eastern ends of Route 5 and Route 7 and intersected the north–south Route 6 and Route 28. The highway left Boston for the North Shore of Massachusetts, then passed through the Seacoast Region of New Hampshire to Portsmouth. Route 1A in New Hampshire followed the shore from Seabrook to Portsmouth where the route met the southern end of Route 16.

Route 1 continued along the southern Maine coast, where the highway had junctions with Route 9 and Route 11 in Wells and Biddeford, respectively. The highway met three route termini in Portland: Route 18, Route 25, and Route 26. Route 1 continued northeast to Brunswick, where the highway intersected the eastern and southern ends of Route 19 and Route 20, respectively. The route continued through the Down East cities of Belfast and Ellsworth before turning north to its terminus in Calais, where the highway met the southern end of Route 24 before entering New Brunswick.

The general course of Route 1 is today followed by U.S. Route 1, which served as the main highway of the Atlantic coast of not just New England but the United States until it was eclipsed by Interstate 95. Route 1A in Rhode Island was replaced with Rhode Island Route 3, and in New Hampshire was replaced with New Hampshire Route 1A.

Route 2

Route 2, or the Connecticut River Way, began at Route 1 in New Haven, Connecticut. The highway headed north through Meriden and entered the Connecticut River valley south of Hartford, where the highway joined Route 3 and Route 17 to cross the Bulkeley Bridge to the east side of the river. Route 2 followed the east side of the river from East Hartford into the Pioneer Valley of Massachusetts. At Springfield, the highway joined Route 5 on the Memorial Bridge to return to the west side of the river. Route 2 headed north through Holyoke to Northampton, where the highway was joined by Route 10. The two New England routes intersected Route 7 at Greenfield before diverging at Bernardston, where Route 10 crossed the river to serve New Hampshire and Route 2 continued along the west side of the river into Vermont.

Route 2 briefly ran concurrently with Route 9 through Brattleboro. The highway passed through Bellows Falls and intersected Route 11 in Springfield. At Weathersfield, Route 2 was joined by Route 12, which came across the river from Claremont, New Hampshire. The two highways diverged at Hartland, then Route 2 continued into White River Junction and its junctions with Route 13 and Route 14, which crossed the river together into Lebanon, New Hampshire. The highway intersected Route 25A in Bradford and Route 25 in Wells River. Route 2 left the Connecticut River at Barnet and intersected Route 15 and Route 18 in St. Johnsbury. At West Burke, Route 2 continued northwest while Route 2A continued north. Route 2 was joined by Route 12 again at Barton. The two highways passed through Orleans and received the northern end of Route 12B at Coventry before Route 12 ended at Newport. Route 2 headed east to receive the northern end of Route 2A at Derby before reaching the Canadian border, where the road entered Quebec.

The general course of Route 2 is today followed by U.S. Route 5, the main route through the Connecticut River valley until it was succeeded by Interstate 91. Route 2A was replaced with Vermont Route 5A.

Route 3

Route 3, or the New York, Hartford, Providence, and Cape Cod Route, began at the New York state line in Danbury, Connecticut. The highway headed east through Newtown to Waterbury. Route 3 joined Route 8 north from Waterbury to Thomaston, then headed east through Bristol and Plainville. The highway bypassed New Britain on its way to Hartford, where the highway intersected Route 10 and crossed the Connecticut River on the Bulkeley Bridge with Route 2 and Route 17. In East Hartford, Route 2 split to the north, Route 17 split to the southeast, and Route 3 continued east through Manchester to Willimantic, where it met Route 32. The highway continued through Danielson, the site of its junction with Route 12, before entering Rhode Island.

Route 3 crossed northern Rhode Island to Providence, where the highway intersected Route 1. The highway entered Massachusetts and served the South Coast cities of Fall River and New Bedford. Route 3 met the southern end of Route 28 at Wareham and in Bourne met a connector road to Route 6 at Sagamore. Route 3 headed south from Bourne to Falmouth, then headed east along the Nantucket Sound shore of Cape Cod through Hyannis. The highway turned north at Chatham and met the eastern end of Route 6 in Orleans. Route 3 continued north and then west along the narrowing cape to its terminus in Provincetown.

The general course of Route 3 was replaced by U.S. Route 6, except from New York to Danbury by Connecticut Route 35, from Southbury to Farmington by local roads and Connecticut Route 10, and from Bourne to Orleans, which is today part of Massachusetts Route 28. The Danbury–East Hartford portion of the highway was further superseded by Interstate 84, and the Providence–Wareham portion was replaced by Interstate 195.

Route 4

Route 4, or the New York, Berkshire, and Burlington Way, began at the New York state line in Sharon, Connecticut. The highway continued south along the eastern edge of New York to New York City. Route 4 headed northeast through Salisbury to North Canaan, where the highway met Route 17. The two highways headed north to Great Barrington, Massachusetts, where Route 17 split west. Route 4 continued north through the Berkshire Hills, where the highway ran concurrently with Route 5 from Lenox to Pittsfield and with Route 7 through Williamstown. Route 4 continued north along the western side of Vermont, intersecting Route 9 in Bennington, Route 11 in Manchester, and Route 13 in Rutland. The highway began a long concurrency with Route 30 in Middlebury. Route 4 and Route 30 met the northern end of Route 30A in Vergennes, then the highways followed the eastern side of Lake Champlain to Burlington, where they met the western end of Route 14. Route 4 and Route 30 met the western end of Route 15 in Winooski before Route 30 split west at Colchester to serve Grand Isle. Route 4 continued north through St. Albans to the Canadian border at Highgate Springs, where the road entered Quebec.

Route 4 followed the general course of what is now U.S. Route 7 from North Canaan to Highgate Springs. The highway was further superseded by Interstate 89 from Burlington to Canada. South of North Canaan, the highway followed what is now U.S. Route 44 to Salisbury, Connecticut Route 41 to Sharon, and Connecticut Route 343 and New York State Route 343 to Amenia, New York. From there, the highway, which in New York was not officially part of the New England road marking system, followed what is today New York State Route 22 to New York City.

Route 5

Route 5, known as the Hubway, began at the New York state line in Pittsfield, Massachusetts. The highway headed east to the center of Pittsfield, then joined Route 4 south to Lenox. As Route 5 crossed the Berkshire Hills, it briefly ran concurrently with Route 8 in West Becket. The highway intersected Route 10 in Westfield and joined Route 2 to cross the Connecticut River on the Memorial Bridge into Springfield. Route 5 continued east through Palmer, where the highway was joined briefly by Route 32, then headed northeast through Warren, Brookfield, and Spencer to Worcester, where the highway intersected Route 12. The highway continued east through Marlboro and Weston and entered Boston, where Route 5 had connections with Route 28, Route 7, Route 6, and Route 1.

Route 5 was replaced by U.S. Route 20 for most of its length. However, between Palmer and Shrewsbury, the highway followed the corridors of what are now Massachusetts Route 67 and Massachusetts Route 9. Route 5 was further superseded along its entire length by the Massachusetts Turnpike.

Route 6

Route 6, which was referred to as the Cape Cod White Mountains Way, began at a junction with Route 3 in Orleans, Massachusetts, on Cape Cod. The highway headed west along the Cape Cod Bay shore of the peninsula, passing through Dennis on its way to Sagamore, where the route had a connector road to Route 3 in Bourne. Route 6 continued northwest through what are now the South Shore suburbs of Boston. The main highway passed through Plymouth, Kingston, Weymouth, and Quincy. An alternate route, Route 6A, passed closer to the Massachusetts Bay coast between Plymouth and Quincy, serving Duxbury and Cohasset. Route 6 continued into Boston, where the highway intersected Route 1 and Route 28 and met the eastern end of Route 7. The highway headed northwest from Boston to Lowell, where the highway followed the Merrimack River into New Hampshire.

Route 6 passed through New Hampshire's three largest cities, Nashua, Manchester, and the state capital of Concord. The highway ran concurrently with Route 28 between Manchester and Suncook, and the highway intersected Route 9 in Concord. At Franklin, Route 6 met the eastern end of Route 14 and joined with Route 11 to leave the Merrimack valley and pass through the heart of the Lakes Region. The two routes diverged north of Laconia, and as Route 6 returned to the Pemigewasset River valley, it ran concurrently with Route 25 from Meredith to Plymouth. Route 6A provided a more direct alternate route from Franklin to Plymouth via Bristol. Route 6 continued through the White Mountains, which the route summitted at Franconia Notch. The highway intersected Route 18 at Twin Mountain and Route 15 at Lancaster, then reached its end at a joint terminus with Route 26 in Colebrook.

Route 6 followed the general course of what is now U.S. Route 6 from Orleans to Sagamore and Massachusetts Route 3 from Sagamore to Boston. The highway was replaced by U.S. Route 3 from Boston to its northern terminus. Route 6A in Massachusetts is now Massachusetts Route 3A, and Route 6A in New Hampshire is now New Hampshire Route 3A.

Route 7

Route 7, or the Mohawk Trail, began at the New York state line in Hancock, Massachusetts. The highway started heading north from the state line and turned east in Williamstown, through which the highway joined Route 4. Route 7 intersected Route 8 in North Adams and crossed the Berkshire Hills. The highway emerged into the Pioneer Valley at Greenfield, where the highway intersected Route 2 and Route 10 and crossed the Connecticut River at the site of the General Pierce Bridge. East of the Connecticut River valley, Route 7 ran concurrently with Route 32 between Athol and Baldwinville and intersected Route 12 in Fitchburg. The highway continued southeast through Concord and Lexington and joined Route 6 entering Boston, where the highways had connections with Route 1 and Route 28.

Route 7 was superseded by Massachusetts Route 2 for almost all of its length. However, the highway followed Massachusetts Route 43 from its western terminus to Williamstown and ran south of the current route of Massachusetts Route 2 from Greenfield to Millers Falls.

Route 8

Route 8, or the Stratford, Waterbury, and North Adams Route, began at Route 1 in Stratford, Connecticut. The highway paralleled the Housatonic River to Shelton, where the highway crossed the river into Derby and followed the Naugatuck River through Waterbury. Route 8 ran concurrently with Route 3 from Waterbury to Thomaston, then continued north through Torrington to Winsted, where the highway intersected Route 17. Route 8 continued through the Berkshire Hills through West Becket, where the highway briefly joined Route 5, and Dalton. The highway intersected Route 7 in North Adams, then crossed into Vermont and ended at Route 9 in Wilmington.

Route 8 was supplanted by Connecticut Route 8, Massachusetts Route 8, and Vermont Route 8, though by 1927, the route in Vermont was relocated along modern-day Route 100.

Route 9

Route 9, named the Bennington Wells Route, began at the New York state line in Bennington, Vermont. The number continued west to Troy, New York, along what was briefly New York State Route 9. Route 9 intersected Route 4 in the center of Bennington and crossed the Green Mountains before meeting the northern end of Route 8 in Wilmington. The highway crossed Hogback Mountain then descended into the Connecticut River valley to Brattleboro. Route 9 briefly followed Route 2 through town before crossing the river into New Hampshire. The highway headed northeast through Keene, where it intersected Route 10 and Route 12. Route 9 ran concurrently with Route 32 between Hillsboro and Henniker before reaching the state capital of Concord, where it had a junction with Route 6. The highway continued through Epsom, the site of its intersection with Route 28, to Dover, where the route crossed Route 16. Route 9 crossed the Salmon Falls River into Maine at Berwick and reached its eastern terminus at Route 1 in Wells on the southern Maine coast.

Route 9 was replaced with Vermont Route 9, New Hampshire Route 9, and a small portion of Maine Route 9.

Route 10

Route 10, designated the Central New England Route, began at Route 1 in Old Saybrook, Connecticut. The highway headed north along the west side of the Connecticut River through Middletown to Hartford. Within the state capital, Route 10 intersected Route 2 and Route 3 and joined Route 17 northwest to Avon. The highway turned north to pass through Granby and enter Massachusetts at Southwick. Route 10 continued north through Westfield, where it intersected Route 5, then veered northeast to Northampton. The highway ran concurrently with Route 2 through Greenfield, the site of its junction with Route 7 to Bernardston. Route 10 crossed to the east side of the Connecticut River at Northfield and headed north along the river into New Hampshire. Route 10 turned east at Hinsdale then north at Winchester to Keene, where the route intersected Route 9 and Route 12. The highway met Route 11 at Newport and joined Route 14 west through Lebanon to return to the Connecticut River valley. Route 10 followed the east side of the river through Orford to Haverhill. The highway joined Route 25 from there to Woodsville, then Route 10 split northeast to its terminus at Route 18 in Littleton.

The general course of Route 10 was later followed by Connecticut Route 9, U.S. Route 44, Connecticut Route 189, Connecticut Route 10, Massachusetts Route 10, New Hampshire Route 10, and U.S. Route 302. The directional turns between Northfield and Winchester are now part of Route 63 and New Hampshire Route 119. Small portions of the highway have been superseded further by Interstate 91 and Interstate 89.

Route 11

Route 11, deemed the Manchester Biddeford Route, began at Route 4 in Manchester, Vermont. The highway crossed the Green Mountains and emerged into the Connecticut River valley at Springfield, where the highway intersected Route 2. Route 11 crossed the river to Charlestown, New Hampshire, where the highway met Route 12. The two highways headed north along the east side of the Connecticut River to Claremont, where Route 12 split west to cross the river and Route 11 headed east to Newport, where the route intersected Route 10. Route 11 met the northern end of Route 32 in Sunapee, where the highway curved north around Lake Sunapee. The highway was joined by Route 14 in Andover; the two highways headed east to Route 14's eastern terminus in Franklin. At that junction, Route 6A headed north along the Pemigewasset River valley while Route 6 and Route 11 headed east into the Lakes Region. North of Laconia, Route 11 split from Route 6 and followed the southern shore of Lake Winnipesaukee to Alton, where the highway intersected Route 28. The highway continued southeast to Rochester, where the highway intersected Route 16 and crossed the Salmon Falls River into Maine. Route 11 passed through Sanford and Alfred on its journey to its eastern terminus at Route 1 in Biddeford.

Route 11 was succeeded by Vermont Route 11, New Hampshire Route 11, a small piece of Maine State Route 11 from the state line to Alfred, and Maine State Route 111 from Alfred to Biddeford.

Route 12

Route 12, which was named the Keene Way, began at Route 1 in New London, Connecticut. The highway followed the west side of the Thames River to Norwich, where the route intersected Route 17 and Route 32. Route 12 continued through the Quinebaug River valley and intersected Route 3 at Danielson before entering Massachusetts. In that state, the highway intersected Route 5 in Worcester and passed through Leominster. Route 12 veered northwest after meeting Route 7 in Fitchburg and passed through Winchendon before entering New Hampshire. The highway passed through Keene, where it intersected Route 9 and Route 10, and reached the Connecticut River valley at Walpole.

Route 12 followed the east side of the river north through Charlestown, where Route 11 joined its course, to Claremont, after which the route headed west into Weathersfield, Vermont. The highway ran concurrently with Route 2 north to Hartland and briefly joined Route 13 on its way to Woodstock. Route 12 continued north to Bethel, where the route joined Route 14 to the state capital of Montpelier. Between Randolph and Northfield, Route 12A formed a western loop that served Braintree and Roxbury. The highway briefly followed Route 18 out of the capital before splitting north to Hardwick, where the route briefly ran with Route 15. Route 12B split from the mainline at Hardwick while Route 12 followed a more easterly path to Barton, where Route 12 began to share road with Route 2. Route 12B met up with Route 2 and Route 12 at Coventry before Route 12 reached its northern terminus at Newport, from which Route 2 continued north toward Quebec.

Route 12 was replaced by Connecticut Route 32 from New London to Norwich, Connecticut Route 12 north of Norwich, Massachusetts Route 12, New Hampshire Route 12, and Vermont Route 12 from the Connecticut River to Montpelier. North of Montpelier, Route 12 was replaced with Vermont Route 14 to Hardwick, Vermont Route 16 to Barton, and U.S. Route 5 to Newport. Route 12A is now Vermont Route 12A, and Route 12B was succeeded by Vermont Route 14. Route 12 was further functionally replaced in various sections by Connecticut's Interstate 395, Interstate 190 and Interstate 290 in Massachusetts, and Interstate 91 and Interstate 89 in Vermont.

Route 13

Route 13, also known as the Whitehall White River Junction Way, began at the New York state line in Fair Haven, Vermont, east of Whitehall, New York. In the center of Fair Haven, the highway intersected Route 30, with which the highway headed east, and the southern end of Route 30A. Route 13 and Route 30 ran concurrently to Castleton, then Route 13 continued to Rutland, where the highway intersected Route 4. The highway crossed the Green Mountains between Rutland and Bridgewater. Route 13 continued through Woodstock, east of which the highway briefly joined Route 12, to its eastern terminus at Route 2 in White River Junction.

Route 13's corridor was taken over by U.S. Route 4.

Route 14

Route 14, known as the Burlington Franklin Way, began at Route 4 and Route 30 in Burlington, Vermont. The highway paralleled the Winooski River through the Green Mountains to Montpelier. In the state capital, Route 14 joined Route 12 and the beginning of Route 18. The latter two routes split northeast while Route 14 headed southeast through Barre, where Route 25 split to the east. Route 14 headed south through Royalton and southeast to White River Junction, where the highway intersected Route 2. The highway crossed the Connecticut River to Lebanon, New Hampshire, through which the highway ran concurrently with Route 10. The route headed southeast through Canaan and Danbury to Andover. Route 14 joined Route 11 east from Andover to the former route's eastern terminus in Franklin at Route 6 and Route 6A.

Route 14 was superseded by U.S. Route 2, Vermont Route 14, and U.S. Route 4. The former two highways were themselves superseded by Interstate 89.

Route 15

Route 15, deemed the Burlington Bangor Way, began not in Burlington but just to the north at Route 4 and Route 30 in Winooski. The highway headed northeast through Cambridge and followed the Lamoille River through the Green Mountains and through Morrisville. Route 15 intersected the southern end of Route 12A and briefly ran concurrently with Route 12 in Hardwick. The highway joined Route 18 in Danville; the two highways passed through St. Johnsbury, where they intersected Route 2, before diverging. Route 15 continued northeast through Lunenburg before crossing the Connecticut River into Lancaster, New Hampshire, where the route intersected Route 6. The highway headed southeast through the White Mountains to Gorham, where the highway intersected Route 16 and followed the Androscoggin River into Maine.

Route 15 joined with Route 26 between Bethel and Newry and left the valley of the Androscoggin River at Dixfield. The highway continued through Farmington and entered the Kennebec River valley at Norridgewock, where the route joined Route 20 to Skowhegan. Route 15 passed through Pittsfield and Newport before reaching Bangor, where the highway connected with Route 1. While Route 1 headed back Down East in both directions, Route 15 headed north through the Penobscot River valley through Milford and Enfield. The highway left the Penobscot valley at Mattawamkeag and curved northeast through Island Falls. Route 15 passed through Houlton, where the highway intersected Route 24, before entering New Brunswick.

Route 15 was replaced by Vermont Route 15 and U.S. Route 2. The highway was further superseded by Interstate 95 between Bangor and Houlton.

Route 16

Route 16, or the East Side Road, began at Route 1 in Portsmouth, New Hampshire. The highway headed north on the west side of the Piscataqua River and Salmon Falls River and intersected Route 9 in Dover and Route 11 in Rochester. Route 16 passed through the eastern side of the Lakes Region, within which the route received the northern end of Route 28 at Ossipee and joined with Route 25. The highway ran concurrently with Route 18 from Conway to Glen, then crossed the White Mountains at Pinkham Notch on the east side of Mount Washington. Route 16 intersected Route 15 in Gorham and passed through Berlin before reaching its northern terminus at Route 26 at Errol.

Route 16 was superseded by New Hampshire Route 16.

Route 17

Route 17, or the Westerly Route, began at the New York state line in Egremont, Massachusetts. The highway headed east to Great Barrington, then followed Route 4 south into Connecticut. At North Canaan, Route 17 split from Route 4 and headed southeast through Winsted and Canton into Hartford. The highway joined Route 2 and Route 3 to cross the Connecticut River on the Bulkeley Bridge. In East Hartford, Route 17 split southeast from Route 3 through Marlborough and Colchester. The highway briefly ran concurrently with Route 32 through Norwich, where the highways intersected Route 12. Route 17 continued southeast from Norwich to its eastern terminus at Route 1 in Stonington, Connecticut, just west of Westerly, Rhode Island.

Route 17 was replaced by Massachusetts Route 23, U.S. Route 7, U.S. Route 44, and Connecticut Route 2.

Route 18

Route 18, designated the Crawford Notch Way, began at Route 12 and Route 14 in Montpelier, Vermont. The three highways passed through the state capital, then Route 14 split southeast toward Barre and Route 12 split north for Hardwick. Route 18 headed northeast and joined Route 15 at Danville to run through St. Johnsbury, where the highways intersected Route 2. East of town, Route 18 split southeast to cross the Connecticut River into New Hampshire at Waterford. The highway met the northern end of Route 10 at Littleton and intersected Route 6 in Twin Mountain. Route 18 crossed the White Mountains by way of Crawford Notch, then followed the Saco River to Conway, north of which the highway ran concurrently with Route 16 and Route 28 The highway followed the river into Maine with Route 28 which terminated at the state line, then passed through Bridgton and Naples before reaching its eastern terminus at Route 1 in Portland.

Route 18 was superseded by U.S. Route 2, Vermont Route 18, New Hampshire Route 18, and U.S. Route 302.

Route 20

Route 20, named the Portland Quebec Highway, began not in Portland but at Route 1 in Brunswick, Maine. The highway headed north to Gardiner, where the highway began to follow the Kennebec River. Route 20 continued through Augusta and Waterville to Skowhegan. The highway joined Route 15 west to Norridgewock, then turned north again to follow the Kennebec River toward Quebec. Route 20 left the river north of Caratunk and reached its northern end at the Canadian border north of Jackman, beyond which the road continued toward Quebec City.

Route 20 was replaced by U.S. Route 201.

Route 24

Route 24 was originally intended to connect Brunswick and Greenville, Maine, but instead it began in Calais where Route 1 crossed into New Brunswick. The highway headed west along the St. Croix River through Princeton. Route 24 continued north through Topsfield and Danforth to Houlton, where the highway intersected Route 15. The highway continued through the Aroostook County towns of Mars Hill, Presque Isle, and Caribou. Route 24 began paralleling the St. John River at Van Buren. The highway followed the river northwest through Grand Isle to Madawaska, where the highway terminated at its crossing of the river into Edmundston, New Brunswick.

Route 24 is now wholly part of U.S. Route 1.

Route 25

Route 25, or the Montpelier Portland Route, began not in the state capital of Vermont but to the east at Route 14 in Barre. The highway's alternate route, Route 25A, split southeast from the main route in Orange. The main route continued east to Wells River, where the highway intersected Route 2 and crossed the Connecticut River. From Woodsville, New Hampshire, the highway ran concurrently south with Route 10 to Haverhill. Route 25A intersected Route 2 in Bradford, Vermont, and crossed the river into Piermont, New Hampshire, then joined Route 10 north to reconnect with its parent at Haverhill. Route 25 headed southeast through Warren to Plymouth, joining Route 6A for its last few miles to reconnect with the latter route's parent, Route 6. Route 25 joined Route 6 through the Lakes Region to Meredith, where Route 25 headed northeast to the north of Lake Winnipesaukee to Ossipee. There, the highway briefly joined Route 16 before striking out east into Maine. Route 25 headed through Cornish, Standish, and Westbrook on its way to its eastern terminus at Route 1 in Portland.

Route 25 was replaced by U.S. Route 302, most of New Hampshire Route 25, and Maine State Route 25. Route 25A was replaced by Vermont Route 25 and a little bit of New Hampshire Route 25.

Route 26

Route 26, also known as the Dixville Notch way, began at Route 1 in Portland, Maine. The highway headed north through Gray, Poland, and Norway. Route 26 curved west to Bethel, where the highway joined Route 15 along the Androscoggin River to Newry. The highway continued northwest into New Hampshire, where the highway met the northern end of Route 16 at Errol. Route 26 crossed the White Mountains at Dixville Notch before reaching its northern end at Route 6 at Colebrook on the Connecticut River.

Route 26 was superseded by Maine State Route 26 and New Hampshire Route 26.

Route 28

Route 28 began at Route 3 along Buzzards Bay in Wareham, Massachusetts. The highway headed north through the interior of southeastern Massachusetts via Middleborough and Brockton. In Boston, Route 28 had connections with Route 1, Route 5, Route 6, and Route 7. The highway passed through Reading and crossed the Merrimack River at Lawrence before entering New Hampshire. Route 28 passed through Derry before reaching Manchester, from which the highway ran concurrently with Route 6 to Suncook. The highway intersected Route 9 at Epsom and Route 11 in Alton and passed along the east side of Lake Winnipesaukee before reaching Route 16 in Ossipee, following it through Tamworth, Albany and Conway before intersecting with Route 18 and running concurrently with it to the state line with Maine near Fryeburg where it terminated.

Route 28 was replaced by most of Massachusetts Route 28 and New Hampshire Route 28.

Route 30

Route 30, also known as the Vergennes Fair Haven Route, began at the New York state line in Poultney, Vermont . The highway headed north along the east side of the Poultney River to Route 13 at Fair Haven. From there, the highway's alternate route, Route 30A, continued north from the town through Orwell and Addison while Route 30 joined Route 13 in a concurrency east to Castleton, where the highway turned north through Sudbury and Cornwall to Middlebury. There, Route 30 ran concurrently with Route 4 to Vergennes, where Route 30A rejoined the main route. Route 30 and Route 4 continued north along the east side of Lake Champlain to Burlington and Winooski, in which the highways met the western ends of Route 14 and Route 15, respectively. Near Colchester, Route 30 split northwest from Route 4 and ran the length of Grand Isle County. At Alburgh, Route 30 continued north to its end at the Canadian border while a spur, Route 30B, headed west toward Rouses Point, New York.

Route 30 was mostly replaced by local roads between Poultney and Fair Haven, then U.S. Route 4, Vermont Route 30, U.S. Route 7, U.S. Route 2, and Vermont Route 225. Route 30A was superseded by Vermont Route 22A, and Route 30B was taken over by U.S. Route 2.

Route 32

Route 32, or the Lake Sunapee Route, began at Route 1 in Groton, Connecticut. The highway followed the east side of the Thames River to Norwich, where the highway intersected Route 12 and Route 17. Route 32 continued north through Willimantic, where the route had a junction with Route 3, and left Connecticut after passing through Stafford Springs. The highway continued to Palmer, Massachusetts, the site of its junction with Route 5. Route 32 continued northeast through Ware and Barre, then northwest through Petersham to Athol. The highway joined Route 7 east to Baldwinville, then headed northeast through Winchendon, where the highway intersected Route 12 again, into New Hampshire. Route 32 headed through Peterborough to Hillsborough, where the highway met Route 9. The two highways ran concurrently to Henniker, then Route 32 split northwest to Newbury, from which the highway followed the west side of Lake Sunapee to its terminus at Route 11 at Sunapee.

Route 32 was superseded by Connecticut Route 12, Connecticut Route 32, Massachusetts Route 32, U.S. Route 202, New Hampshire Route 114, New Hampshire Route 103, and New Hampshire Route 103B.

State routes 
=== Connecticut ===
[
{
  "type": "ExternalData",
  "service": "page",
  "title": "New England Road Marking System/Connecticut Routes.map"
},
{
  "type": "ExternalData",
  "service": "page",
  "title": "New England Road Marking System/Connecticut Interstate Routes.map",
"properties": {
"stroke": "#0000ff",
"stroke-width": 5 
}
}
]

Maine 
Maine adopted the system three years after its inception, replacing the existing lettered routes and auto trails. The state began to add two and one digit routes in 1931; a full renumbering in 1933 effectively ended Maine's involvement in the system.
[
{
  "type": "ExternalData",
  "service": "page",
  "title": "New England Road Marking System/Maine Routes.map"
},
{
  "type": "ExternalData",
  "service": "page",
  "title": "New England Road Marking System/Maine Interstate Routes.map",
"properties": {
"stroke": "#0000ff",
"stroke-width": 5 
}
}
]

Massachusetts 
Massachusetts abandoned the scheme quickly with the advent of the U.S. Highway Numbering, having renumbered Route 6 south of Boston to match U.S. 3. By 1929, 2-digit routes were beginning to be assigned.
[
{
  "type": "ExternalData",
  "service": "page",
  "title": "New England Road Marking System/Massachusetts Routes.map"
},
{
  "type": "ExternalData",
  "service": "page",
  "title": "New England Road Marking System/Massachusetts Interstate Routes.map",
"properties": {
"stroke": "#0000ff",
"stroke-width": 5 
}
}
]

New Hampshire 
[
{
  "type": "ExternalData",
  "service": "page",
  "title": "New England Road Marking System/New Hampshire Routes.map"
},
{
  "type": "ExternalData",
  "service": "page",
  "title": "New England Road Marking System/New Hampshire Interstate Routes.map",
"properties": {
"stroke": "#0000ff",
"stroke-width": 5 
}
}
]

Rhode Island 
[
{
  "type": "ExternalData",
  "service": "page",
  "title": "New England Road Marking System/Rhode Island Routes.map"
},
{
  "type": "ExternalData",
  "service": "page",
  "title": "New England Road Marking System/Rhode Island Interstate Routes.map",
"properties": {
"stroke": "#0000ff",
"stroke-width": 5 
}
}
]

Vermont 
The state of Vermont already had a system of state-maintained roads by the time of the introduction of the numbering scheme. With the introduction of the U.S. Highway Numbering, it seems that Vermont was quick to drop the New England numbering where convenient, having renumbered many interstate routes by 1927.

By 1927, Route 8 in Vermont took a different course than that established in 1922. From the Massachusetts line, the route made its way along modern Route 8 to Heartwellville, then along modern Route 100 and Boyd Hill Road to Wilmington. An additional segment from Rawsonville to Londonderry is also cited in the 1927 US Bureau of Public Roads study, though its relation during this time to the former route is unclear. In later USGS topo maps, this gap was bridged by modern Route 100.
[
{
  "type": "ExternalData",
  "service": "page",
  "title": "New England Road Marking System/Vermont Routes.map"
},
{
  "type": "ExternalData",
  "service": "page",
  "title": "New England Road Marking System/Vermont Interstate Routes.map",
"properties": {
"stroke": "#0000ff",
"stroke-width": 5 
}
}
]

References

State highways in Connecticut
State highways in Maine
Numbered routes in Massachusetts
State highways in New Hampshire
Numbered routes in Rhode Island
State highways in Vermont
Lists of roads in the United States